Echinus may refer to:
 Echinus (Acarnania), a town in ancient Acarnania, Greece
 Echinus (Thessaly), a town in ancient Thessaly, Greece; also a Roman Catholic titular bishopric
 Echinus (molding), a molding similar to the ovolo
 Echinus (sea urchin), a genus of animals
 Echinus (plant), a synonym for the plant genus Mallotus